Elbert Jan Roest (born 13 October 1954 in Hoogezand) is a Dutch historian, politician and former teacher. He is a member of Democrats 66 (D66).

From 1992 to 2002, Roest was a member of the municipal council of Doesburg and also an alderman. Roest was the mayor of Laren, North Holland from 2002 until 2017.

Roest studied history at the University of Groningen.

References 
  Website of Laren, North Holland

1954 births
Living people
Aldermen in Gelderland
Democrats 66 politicians
Dutch schoolteachers
20th-century Dutch historians
Mayors in North Holland
Municipal councillors in Gelderland
People from Doesburg
People from Hoogezand-Sappemeer
People from Laren, North Holland
University of Groningen alumni